Charles Joseph Fogarty, Jr., also known as Charlie Fogarty (born September 15, 1955) is an American politician who served as the 67th lieutenant governor of Rhode Island. He is a Democrat. Fogarty served two full terms as lieutenant governor, first elected to the position in 1998 and leaving office on January 2, 2007.

His father, Charles Fogarty, Sr., was a state senator and director of the Rhode Island Small Business Administration. His uncle, John E. Fogarty, was a United States Congressman for 26 years. His brother Paul Fogarty was elected as a Rhode Island state senator in 1998 and still holds the position.

A graduate of the La Salle Academy and Providence College, Fogarty received a master's degree in public administration from the University of Rhode Island.

Fogarty was previously elected to the Glocester Town Council in 1984 and in 1990 was elected as a state senator, where he served for eight years. While a state senator, he served as both majority whip and Senate President Pro Tempore.

He was elected lieutenant governor in 1998 and re-elected in 2002.  He served as lieutenant governor from 1999 to 2007.

Fogarty was a candidate for Governor of Rhode Island in 2006. He was running against incumbent Republican Governor Donald Carcieri, as Fogarty was barred from seeking re-election in 2006 due to term limits. He was defeated by a slim margin of around 8,000 votes.

Rhode Island is one of 19 states that elects its governor and lieutenant governor separately rather than on a single party ticket.

Fogarty was appointed by Governor Lincoln Chafee in January 2011 as the director for the Rhode Island Department of Labor and Training.  In this position, Forgarty cracked down of fraudulent recipients of unemployment benefits.

In January 2015, Fogarty was appointed by Governor Gina Raimondo as director of the Rhode Island Department of Elderly Affairs.

Electoral history
2006 race for governor
Donald Carcieri (R) (inc.), 51%
Charles Fogarty (D), 49%
2002 race for lieutenant governor
Charles Fogarty (D) (inc.), 54%
John Pagliarini (R), 25%
Robert J. Healey (I), 19%
Gregg Stevens (Grn.), 3%
1998 race for lieutenant governor
Charles Fogarty (D), 50%
Bernard Jackvony (R) (inc.), 44%

External links

|-

1955 births
Living people
Candidates in the 2006 United States elections
La Salle Academy alumni
Lieutenant Governors of Rhode Island
Providence College alumni
Democratic Party Rhode Island state senators